The Civil Service Protection and Training Commission (CSPTC) is a ministry level policy-making body, governed under the Examination Yuan of the Republic of China and is the fundamental Examination Yuan agency responsible for training and safeguarding the rights and interests of civil servants.

Current Operations

Safeguard for Civil Servants 
The CSPTC reviews petitions for deliberation (against administrative actions taken by the employer or relevant personnel agency of the civil servant) and re-appeal cases (against decisions, deemed unacceptable by the civil servant, made by the employer regarding an appeal to its management measures or working conditions) that are filed to the commission. The commission's decisions are binding and will be followed up.

Civil Servant Training Programs 
The CSPTC provides the following training programs: training for personnel who passed the civil service examinations; promotion training; training for medium- to long-term development of senior civil servants; and training on administrative neutrality.

Administrative structure
The Commission is currently organized as follows:

 Commissioners
 Department of Civil Service Protection
 Department of Local Civil Service Protection
 Department of Special Examinations
 Department of Training Development
 Department of Training Assessment
 Secretariat
 Personnel Office
 Accounting Office
 Counselors Office
 Ethics Office

Subordinate Agencies 
 National Academy of Civil Service

Ministers

See also 
 Government of the Republic of China
 Examination Yuan

References

External links 

 Official site

1996 establishments in Taiwan
Examination Yuan
National civil service commissions